WPBN-TV (channel 7) is a television station licensed to Traverse City, Michigan, United States, serving as the NBC affiliate for the northern Lower and eastern Upper peninsulas of Michigan. It is owned by Sinclair Broadcast Group, which provides certain services to ABC affiliate WGTU (channel 29, also licensed to Traverse City) and Sault Ste. Marie–licensed full-time satellite WGTQ (channel 8) under a local marketing agreement (LMA) with Cunningham Broadcasting. However, Sinclair effectively owns WGTU/WGTQ as the majority of Cunningham's stock is owned by the family of deceased group founder Julian Smith. Both stations share studios on M-72 just west of Traverse City, while WPBN-TV's transmitter is located east of Kalkaska, Michigan. The station also operates a low-power digital fill-in translator on UHF channel 22 from a transmitter south of Harrietta in the Manistee National Forest.

Like other network affiliates in this vast and mainly rural area, WPBN-TV operates a full-time, full power satellite in Cheboygan, WTOM-TV (channel 4), whose transmitter is located on US 23 east of the city. Aside from its transmitter, WTOM does not maintain any physical presence in Cheboygan. WTOM's signal reaches as far as Petoskey, Cedarville, Indian River, and Brevort. It was originally intended to serve Sault Ste. Marie and the Eastern Upper Peninsula as well, but the current digital signal does not cover this area. To make up for this shortfall in coverage, WPBN/WTOM is simulcast in high definition on the second digital subchannel of WGTU/WGTQ.

Collectively known on-air as TV 7&4, the two stations serve the largest television market by land area east of the Mississippi River: 23 counties in the Northern Lower Peninsula, three counties in the Eastern Upper Peninsula, and portions of Northern Ontario including Sault Ste. Marie, Ontario. However, WTOM has not been available in Canada on cable since the early 2000s when Shaw Communications replaced it with Detroit's WDIV-TV (channel 4). Until January 25, 2022, when CBS affiliate WBKB-TV affiliated its DT2 subchannel with NBC, WTOM also served as the default NBC affiliate for Alpena, and was dropped by Charter Spectrum systems in the Alpena market on May 1.

History
WPBN-TV began broadcasting on February 13, 1954 airing an analog signal on VHF channel 7. It was owned by the Biederman family and their company, Midwest Broadcasting, along with WTCM-AM 1400 (now 580). Company president Les Biederman had signed on WTCM, Northern Michigan's oldest radio station, in 1940. Over the next decade, he bought or signed-on several other AM stations throughout the area. These were known as the "Paul Bunyan Network," with WTCM as the flagship station. Since channel 7 covered much of the territory covered by the radio stations, Biederman decided not to call his new station WTCM-TV (for Traverse City, Michigan) but rather WPBN-TV (for Paul Bunyan Network).

In the 1950s, the Federal Communications Commission (FCC) collapsed the eastern half of the Upper Peninsula into the Traverse City–Cadillac market. At the time, the only television station in that area had been private CBC affiliate CJIC-TV. Since WPBN was already operating at the maximum power allowed, Biederman signed-on WTOM-TV in Cheboygan on May 16, 1959. WTOM was the first American television station that could be received in the Eastern Upper Peninsula, although Cheboygan is actually in the northernmost part of the Lower Peninsula. Since then, the two stations have been known collectively as 7&4.

Until 1971, it shared ABC programming with CBS affiliates WWTV/WWUP. WPBN aired ABC's sports programming on the weekends while WWTV aired some of the network's game shows and soap operas. In 1971, WGTU signed-on and took the ABC affiliation. In 1980, Midwest Broadcasting wanted to expand its broadcast operations in Northern Michigan. However, the FCC told the family that they could do so only if they sold some stations to stay under ownership limits. One of the stations sold off was WPBN/WTOM (which count as one station for ratings and regulatory purposes), which went to U.S. Tobacco.

U.S. Tobacco owned the station until 1986, at which time sold to Beam Communications. Beam owned the station until 1990, and then sold to Federal Broadcasting Company.

From 1999 to 2005, it was owned by Raycom Media. In late 2005, following that company's purchase of the Liberty Corporation, Raycom announced that WPBN would be sold along with another NBC affiliate in the Upper Peninsula, WLUC-TV in Marquette. The sale was necessary to help meet FCC restrictions on station ownership. On March 27, 2006, Raycom announced that Barrington Broadcasting would acquire twelve Raycom stations, including WPBN. The FCC approved the deal in June 2006 and the finalization took place on August 12. At that point, the station joined WLUC, Saginaw's NBC affiliate WEYI-TV and (to a degree) Toledo, Ohio's NBC affiliate WNWO-TV as part of Barrington's family of stations in and around Michigan.

On September 19, 2007, an application was filed to the FCC by Max Media to sell WGTU, its full-time satellite WGTQ, and CW cable station to Tucker Broadcasting for $10 million. After approval, that company entered into a shared services agreement with Barrington. According to the FCC filing, WPBN would sell advertising time and provides other programming for Tucker's stations. The combined operation was based at WPBN's studios, which were renovated over the summer to accommodate the change. WPBN and WGTU began to share a website as well. For the digital transition on June 12, 2009, WPBN filed a petition with the FCC move its Traverse City digital signal on UHF channel 50 to the analog tower in Harrietta to maintain coverage in that area. It then signed-on a new digital signal on UHF channel 47 from WGTU's tower in Kalkaska.

Unlike WPBN, WTOM-DT on UHF channel 35 did not initially offer NBC programming in full high definition. Instead, the signal was transmitted in an unconverted format. A true high definition signal for that station was included once WTOM shut down its analog signal on the transition date. Its new digital signal covers a fraction of the area once served by the VHF analog signal due to the rather low-powered 78 kW digital signal on UHF. To make up for this shortfall in coverage, standard definition feeds of WPBN and WTOM were added to the digital subcarriers of WGTU and WGTQ respectively; these were later upgraded to high definition.

On February 28, 2013, Barrington Broadcasting announced the sale of its entire group, including WPBN/WTOM, to Sinclair Broadcast Group. Sinclair also acquired the LMA for WGTU/WGTQ, which was sold to Cunningham Broadcasting. The sale was completed on November 25. Nearly all of Cunningham's stock is held by trusts for the Smith family, founders and owners of Sinclair. Thus, for all intents and purposes, Sinclair owns both stations. Cunningham, previously known as Glencairn, has long been used as a shell corporation to allow Sinclair to operate duopolies where Sinclair cannot legally own them. The Traverse City/Cadillac/Sault Sainte Marie market has only seven full-power stations, too few to legally permit a duopoly. Even if the market had enough stations to allow a duopoly, Sinclair would not be able to legally acquire WGTU outright, as both stations are among the top four stations in the market.

News operation

WPBN-TV presently broadcasts 37 hours, 10 minutes of locally produced newscasts each week (with 7 hours, 5 minutes each weekday, one hour on Saturdays and 1 hour, 5 minutes on Sundays).

When WTOM first began broadcasting, it had its own studio on US 23 east of Cheboygan, and broke off from WPBN's signal to air its own newscasts. However, by the early 1980s, this operation had been eliminated, and WTOM is now a full-time satellite of WPBN.

News department history
WPBN's owners had traditionally poured significant resources into its news operation, resulting in a much higher-quality product than conventional wisdom would suggest for such a small market at the time. Currently, the station produces and airs 27 hours of news a week, a considerable amount for a station in the 120th market. In terms of viewership, WPBN has long been a distant runner-up in the news ratings behind market leader WWTV, according to Nielsen Media Research. WPBN has traditionally had more of a Traverse City focus, while WWTV focuses on the entire Northern Michigan region.

Station alumni include Christa Quinn and the immortal "Deputy" Don Melvoin who first hosted the Deputy Don kids' show in the 1950s. After a stint in Hollywood that included roles on The Twilight Zone and a movie filmed on Mackinac Island called Somewhere in Time, Melvoin came back to WPBN to host Deputy Don Rides Again and the horror flick Count Zappula. Don Melvoin died in 2002. In addition to its main studios, there is a bureau in Gaylord on West Main Street, and in Manistee at the Vogue Theater on River Street. In the past, the station had also maintained newsrooms in Petoskey, Cadillac, and at the former WTOM studio in Cheboygan.

On September 10, 2007, it began airing a midday broadcast weekdays at 11 after Today expanded to four hours. In January 2009, the station laid off nine employees and canceled the weekday midday show. After WGTU consolidated its operations with WPBN, it became possible full newscasts would return to WGTU for the first time since 1984. On September 13, 2010, WPBN began producing a weeknight newscast at 6:30 on WGTU, UpNorthLive Tonight. It originates from a secondary set at WPBN's studios, and features local news and weather but also goes into detail covering community events and various businesses. There is no sports report given in this broadcast. The only other newscast on the station is a pre-recorded 10-minute weeknight update at 11.

Subchannels
The stations' digital signals are multiplexed:

Translators

References

External links

NBC network affiliates
Comet (TV network) affiliates
Sinclair Broadcast Group
Television channels and stations established in 1954
PBN-TV